Valentin Iosifovich Gaft (2 September 1935 – 12 December 2020) was a Soviet and Russian actor. He was People's Artist of the RSFSR (1984).

Biography

Early life and education
Gaft was born in Moscow to Jewish parents and sister, Iosif Ruvimovich Gaft (1907–1969), a lawyer, and Gita Davydovna Gaft (1908–1993). Rima Iosifovna Gaft-Shtrom (1930-2021). The family moved to Moscow from Poltava, Ukraine. During World War II Iosif Gaft served in the Red Army finishing with the rank of Major.

Gaft took a great interest in theater while in school and took part in the school theater amateur performance. He graduated from the School-Studio at the Moscow Art Theatre (1953–1957). Among the students of the same course were future popular actors Oleg Tabakov and Maya Menglet.

Theatre

After graduating Gaft worked for a number of theaters including the Mossovet Theatre, Lenkom Theatre (under famous director Anatoly Efros) and Theater of Satire. In 1969 he started to work for the Sovremennik Theatre and worked there until 2019.

Film
Gaft started his work for the cinema in 1956 in the Mikhail Romm's film Murder on Dante Street.

Later he starred in the movies The First Courier (1968), Mad Gold (1977), Centaurs (1979), Black Hen, or Underground Villagers (1981), Fuete (1986). Prominent roles were played by Gaft in the musical comedy The Sorceress (1982), the tragicomedy Through Main Street with an Orchestra (1986), the action film Thieves in Law (1988), The Visit of the Lady (1989), Night Fun (1991), Encore, Once More Encore! (1992).

In 1994, Gaft played Woland in Yuri Kara's film The Master and Margarita, which was only released in 2011.

However, the real popularity came to Gaft only after cooperation with Eldar Ryazanov. In 1979, he played the chairman of the garage cooperative Sidorkin in the comedy The Garage, in 1980, starred in the tragicomedy Say a Word for the Poor Hussar, in 1987, starred in the movie Forgotten Melody for a Flute, and in 1991 in the film Promised Heaven.

In addition to theater and cinema, Gaft played many roles on television – the main character in the television series based on Thomas Mann's novel Buddenbrooks, Lopatin in Lopatin's Notes, Jasper in the four-part film Edin Druid's Secret, Kramin in the television movie For the Rest of His Life, Prince Borescu in the television show The Archipelago Lenoir, The Kid in Kings and Cabbage, Butler in the television film Hello, I'm Your Aunt! and others. Teleplays with Gaft's participation included Just a few words in honor of M. de Moliere, Widow's Home, Players, Aesop, and Who's Afraid of Virginia Woolf?

Personal life
Gaft was married to the actress Olga Ostroumova from 1996 until his death. He was the author of sharp and popular epigrams against many theatrical and movie figures. In the 2013 film Yolki 3, he read some of his own poetry.

Gaft converted to Orthodox Christianity in 1990; his wife persuaded him to get baptized.

In 2016, Gaft was banned from entering Ukraine, for "statements contradicted the interests of our national security".

Gaft died on 12 December 2020 in Moscow at the age of 85.

Selected filmography

 Murder on Dante Street (1956) as Marsel Ruzhe
 Poet (1957) as French soldier
 Oleko Dundich (1958)
 Normandie - Niémen (1960) as Mille
 Russian Souvenir (1960) as Claude Gerard, French composer
 My, russkiy narod (1966)
 O lyubvi (1966) as Nikolai
 Dva goda nad propastyu (1966) as Standartenfuehrer Grause
 Parviyat kurier (1968) as Fon Getsberg
 Intervention (1968) as Dlinnyy
 Novenkaya (1969) as Konstantin Barantsev trener
 Zhdi menya, Anna (1969)
 Family Happiness (1970) as Salesman
 Koroli i kapusta (1970)
 Udivitelnyy malchik (1971) as Doctor Kapa
 Doroga na Ryubetsal (1971) as Apanasenko
 Noch na 14-y paralleli (1971) as Journalist Stepanov
 Chelovek s drugoy storony (1972) as Andrey Izvolskiy
 Razreshite vzlyot! (1972) as Viktor Azancheyev
 That Sweet Word: Liberty! (Это сладкое слово — свобода!, 1973) as Miguel Carrera (voice)
 Moscow, My Love (Москва, любовь моя, 1974) as choreographer
 Zhrebiy (1974) as Kesha
 Sergeyev ishchet Sergeyeva (1974) as Anatoliy Anatolyevich Petelin
 Ivan and Marya (1975) as Paymaster
 For the Rest of His Life (На всю оставшуюся жизнь, 1975, TV Mini-Series) as Lt. Kramin
 Hello, I'm Your Aunt! (Здравствуйте, я ваша тётя!, 1975, TV Movie) as Brasset
 Chudo s kosichkami (1976) (uncredited)
 Beshenoe zoloto (1977)
 Kísértés (1977) as Szép Miska, Béla apja
 Story of an Unknown Actor (1977) as Znamensky
 Skhvatka v purge (1977)
 Prazdnik neposlushaniya (1977)
 Devochka, khochesh snimatsya v kino? (1978) as Pavel Vladimirovich
 Centaurs (Кентавры, 1978) as Andres
 Tsirkachonok (1980) as Georges
 The Garage (Гараж, 1980) as Sidorin
 Utrenniy obkhod (1980) as Alik
 Dog in Boots (Пёс в сапогах, 1981) as Lofty (voice)
 Say a Word for the Poor Hussar (О бедном гусаре замолвите слово..., 1981, TV Movie) as colonel Ivan Pokrovsky
 Chyornaya kuritsa, ili Podzemnye zhiteli (1981) as Deforzh
 Tamozhnya (1982) as Vladimir Nikolayevich Nikitin
 Vertical Race (Гонки по вертикали, 1982, TV Movie) as Lyokha Dedushkin
 Pokhozhdeniya grafa Nevzorova (1983) as Narrator (voice)
 Esli vrag ne sdayotsya... (1983) as Wilhelm Stemmermann
 Vosem dney nadezhdy (1984)
 Kontrakt veka (1985)
 Puteshestviye gospodina Perrishona (1986)
 God telyonka (1986) as Valerian Sergeyevich
 Fuete (1987)
 Forgotten Melody for a Flute (Забытая мелодия для флейты, 1987) as Odinokov
 Through Main Street with an Orchestra (По главной улице с оркестром, 1987) as Konstantin Vinogradov
 Vremya letat (1987)
 Visit to Minotaur (Визит к Минотавру, 1987, TV Mini-Series) as Pavel Ikonnikov
 The Life of Klim Samgin (Жизнь Клима Самгина, 1988, TV Series) as Valery Trifonov
 Vory v zakone (1988) as Artur
 Dorogoe udovolstvie (1988)
 Aelita, ne pristavay k muzhchinam! (1988)
 The Feasts of Belshazzar, or a Night with Stalin (Пиры Валтасара, или Ночь со Сталиным, 1989) as Lavrentiy Beria
 Samoubiytsa (1990)
 Futbolist (1990)
 Lost in Siberia (1991) as Beria
 Terroristka (1991)
 Nochnye zabavy (1991) as Yezopov
 Promised Heaven (Небеса обетованные, 1991) as Dmitry Loginov, “President“
 Encore, Once More Encore! (Анкор, ещё анкор!, 1992) as Fedor Vasilyevich Vinogradov
 Khochu v Ameriku (1993)
 Ya svoboden, ya nichey (1994)
 Karera Arturo Ui (1996)
 Sympathy Seeker (1997) as Magician
 Tayna Marchello (1997)
 Nebo v almazakh (1999)
 Old Hags (Старые клячи, 2000) as general Dubovitsky
 Tender Age (Нежный возраст, 2000) as Saledon Sr.
 House for the Rich (Дом для богатых, 2000) as Roman Rumyanov
 Snezhnaya lyubov, ili Son v zimnyuyu noch (2003)
 The Master and Margarita (Мастер и Маргарита, 2005) as Joseph Kaifa / NKVD general
 The Master and Margarita (Мастер и Маргарита, 2006) as Woland
 Karnavalnaya noch 2, ili 50 let spustya (2007) as Spin doctor
 12 (2007) as 4th juror
 The Book of Masters (Книга Мастеров, 2009) as magic mirror
 Attack on Leningrad (2009) as 
 Burnt by the Sun 2 (Утомлённые солнцем 2, 2010) as Pimen
 The Life and Adventures of Mishka Yaponchik (Жизнь и приключения Мишки Япончика, 2011, TV Series) as Mendel Gersh
 Wings (2012) as Byvaly (voice)
 Käshbasshy zholy (2013) as Professor
 Yolki 3 (Ёлки, 2013) as Nikolai Petrovich
 Tyghyryqtan zhol tapqan (2014)
 Mlechnyy put (2016)

Honors and awards

 Order "For Merit to the Fatherland": 
4th class (15 February 2016) – for outstanding contribution to the development of culture and many years of creative activity
2nd class (2 September 2010) – for outstanding contribution to the development of domestic theatrical art and many years of creative activity
3rd class (2 September 2005) – for outstanding contribution to the development of theatrical art, and many years of creative activity
 Order of Friendship (11 August 1995) – for services to the state and achievements in work and significant contribution to strengthening friendship and cooperation between nations
Honored Artist of the RSFSR (1978)
 People's Artist of the RSFSR (1984)

References

External links

Epigrams by Valentin Gaft 

Russian male actors
Male actors from Moscow
1935 births
2020 deaths
Burials in Troyekurovskoye Cemetery
Recipients of the Order "For Merit to the Fatherland", 2nd class
People's Artists of Russia
Academicians of the Russian Academy of Cinema Arts and Sciences "Nika"
Converts to Eastern Orthodoxy from Judaism
Academicians of the National Academy of Motion Picture Arts and Sciences of Russia
Soviet poets
Soviet male writers
20th-century Russian male writers
Russian male poets
Recipients of the Order "For Merit to the Fatherland", 4th class
Jewish Russian actors
Moscow Art Theatre School alumni
Audiobook narrators
20th-century Russian Jews